The 2009 Toronto Argonauts season was the 52nd season for the team in the Canadian Football League and their 137th overall. The Argonauts attempted to win their 16th Grey Cup championship, but they failed to make the playoffs for the second straight year, finishing the season with a 3–15 record for the first time since 1993.

Training camp opened on June 7 and Toronto's first pre-season game was on June 17, 2009, at the Rogers Centre, hosting the Montreal Alouettes. The regular season kicked off on July 1 at the Hamilton Tiger-Cats' Ivor Wynne Stadium, where the Argos defeated the Ti-Cats 30–17.

Off-season 
On January 16, 2009, the Argonauts announced that Bart Andrus had been hired as the new head coach. He became the 40th head coach in the team's 136-year history and marked his first experience in Canadian football.

CFL draft 
The 2009 CFL Draft took place on May 2, 2009. The Argonauts had the second overall pick and selected Laval tackle Étienne Légaré, immediately signing him to a three-year contract.

Notable transactions 
The Toronto Argonauts were active on the opening day of free agency on February 16 signing tackle Rob Murphy, the most sought after offensive lineman available in the free-agent pool, centre Dominic Picard, and re-signing linebacker Willie Pile, who posted a team-high 75 tackles in 2008.

Preseason

Regular season

Season standings

Season schedule 
 Win
 Loss
 Tie

 † Canadian Football Hall of Fame Game

Roster

Week 1: at Hamilton Tiger-Cats 

at Ivor Wynne Stadium, Hamilton, Ontario
 Game time: 7:00 PM EDT
 Game weather: 18 °C (Rainy)
 Game attendance: 23,211
 Referee: Kim Murphy
 TV announcers: (TSN): Rod Black & Duane Forde

The Argonauts began the season on Canada Day at the Ti-Cats' home stadium and it didn't take long for the traditional rivalry to heat up.

Argonauts Jamal Robertson and Adriano Belli both received players of the week honours for their play in the game. Running back Jamal Robertson's career-high single-game 200 combined yards (134 rushing yards, 53 receiving yards, 13 kickoff return yards) and 1 touchdown earned him the CFL Offensive Player of the Week award while Belli was awarded the Canadian Player of the Week for giving Hamilton quarterback Quinton Porter trouble with two sacks and three tackles in the game.

Week 2: vs Saskatchewan Roughriders 

at Rogers Centre, Toronto
 Game time: 1:00 PM EDT
 Game weather: 23 °C (1st half: Roof closed/2nd half: Partly cloudy)
 Game attendance: 30,055
 Referee: Glen Johnson
 TV announcers: (TSN): Gord Miller, Matt Dunigan, & Claude Feig

Toronto lost their home opener July 11 versus Saskatchewan by a score of 46–36. The Argonauts committed 12 penalties for 124 yards, 109 yards of which were in the first half. The Argonauts opened the game strongly by scoring a touchdown on their opening drive and scoring a field goal after blocking a Luca Congi field goal try to take an early 10–0 lead. Toronto penalties assisted a Saskatchewan drive for a touchdown to make it 10–7. Then, Toronto kicker Justin Medlock made another field goal to end the first quarter with a 13–7 lead. In the second quarter, Toronto allowed Saskatchewan to score thirty unanswered points. Toronto came back in the second half scoring three touchdowns and a field goal and holding Saskatchewan to three field goals but ended up losing by 10. After the game, an angry coach Andrus said that players needed to control the penalties. Adriano Belli in particular, who took 4 penalties for 44 yards in the first half including a head butt that continued the Roughriders first drive for a touchdown, took some criticism: "If he wants to be a WWE wrestler, then he can go do that, but he is not going to do on my football team", said Andrus.

Week 3: at Calgary Stampeders 

at McMahon Stadium, Calgary
 Game time: 7:00 PM MDT
 Game weather: 23 °C (Sky clear, Wind 22 km/h)
 Game attendance: 33,109
 Referee: Murray Clarke
 TV announcers: (TSN): Chris Cuthbert, Glen Suitor, & Sara Orlesky

Toronto lost their second game in a row and again a series of errors in a short period of time helped the opponents to score but this time it was the offence and turnovers that gave the Stampeders a big win. The Argonauts gave up the ball five times in all but the game broke open with two turnovers within 75 seconds in the second half. On the final play of the third quarter, Stampeders linebacker Dwaine Carpenter stripped the ball from quarterback Kerry Joseph and returned it 55 yards for a touchdown and on the next Argos drive, Calgary defensive back Dwight Anderson intercepted a Joseph pass and ran it back 52 yards for another touchdown to make the score 34 to 9. Yet another interception later in the fourth quarter by cornerback Brandon Browner gave the Stampeders three defensive touchdowns and a commanding 44 to 9 victory.

Week 4: at Winnipeg Blue Bombers 

at Canad Inns Stadium, Winnipeg
 Game time: 6:00 PM CDT
 Game weather: 19 °C (Partly cloudy, Wind 25 km/h)
 Game attendance: 28,466
 Referee: Bud Steen
 TV announcers: (TSN): Chris Cuthbert, Glen Suitor, & Sara Orlesky

Week 5: vs Winnipeg Blue Bombers 

at Rogers Centre, Toronto
 Game time: 1:00 PM EDT
 Game weather: 27 °C (Sunny, Wind 11 km/h)
 Game attendance: 23,821
 Referee: Glen Johnson
 TV announcers: (TSN): Rod Black, Duane Forde, & John Lu

This game marked an anniversary of losing at the Rogers Centre, as it officially marked one year without a home victory for the Argonauts. Kerry Joseph had one touchdown throw (to Chad Lucas) but was intercepted four times while the Argos coughed up two additional fumbles (one by Joseph on a sack).

Week 6: at Montreal Alouettes 

at Percival Molson Memorial Stadium, Montreal
 Game time: 7:30 PM EDT
 Game weather: 19 °C (clear, wind 17 km/h)
 Game attendance: 20,202
 Referee: Andre Proulx
 TV announcers: (TSN): Rod Black, Duane Forde, and Brent Wallace

The Argos suffered a 25–0 blanking at the hands of the Montreal Alouettes. It was the first time the Argos had been shut out in seventeen years, and the first time a CFL team was shut out in seventeen years.

Week 7: vs BC Lions 

at Rogers Centre, Toronto
 Game time: 7:30 PM EDT
 Game weather: 25 °C (Sunny, Wind 9 km/h)
 Game attendance: 24,754
 Referee: Andre Proulx
 TV announcers: (TSN): Rod Black, Duane Forde, & Claude Feig

After a humiliating shutout loss the past week, Cody Pickett was given the job of starting quarterback. The game started off with Zeke Moreno intercepting a pass from BC Lions quarterback Buck Pierce. Toronto was leading 9–0, but after Buck Pierce was taken out of the game as a result of concussion-like symptoms, BC's second-string quarterback Jarious Jackson came in and led the Lions to their first touchdown of the game. The Argos responded by delivering a touchdown pass to Reggie McNeal. Although the Argos had a lot of trouble finding the endzone throughout the game, kicker Justin Medlock helped them keep the lead by kicking field goals. Medlock would score seven field goals, tying Lance Chomyc's Argonauts team record and just short of the league record of eight shared by Dave Ridgway, Mark McLoughlin, and Paul Osbaldiston.

Heading into the third quarter, BC head coach Wally Buono decided to switch to his third stringer Travis Lulay since Jackson wasn't getting them anywhere. However, Lulay got injured leaving Jarious Jackson as the Lions only quarterback left standing. When Jackson came back in, he instantly threw a touchdown pass to Paris Jackson to cut Toronto's lead 22–14. In response, Justin Medlock kicked another field goal to increase the Argos lead 25–14.

BC scored two more touchdowns but failed on both of the two point converts they attempted. With Toronto leading 28–26 with just nine seconds remaining on the game clock, BC's rookie kicker Sean Whyte kicked the game-winning field goal to give BC the lead at 29–28. On the final play of the game, Ryan Phillips intercepted Reggie McNeal's attempted lateral and returned it for a touchdown.

It was the Argo's ninth straight loss both at Rogers Centre and against the Lions.

Week 8: BYE WEEK 
The Argos headed into the bye week at 2–5.

Week 9: vs Calgary Stampeders 

at Rogers Centre, Toronto
 Game time: 7:30 PM EDT
 Game weather: Roof closed
 Game attendance: 25,329
 Referee: Kim Murphy
 TV announcers: (TSN): Chris Cuthbert, Glen Suitor, Katherine Dolan

Statistics

Offence

Passing

Rushing

Receiving

Postseason 
After finishing last in the East division, the Argonauts failed to qualify for the 2009 CFL playoffs.

References

External links 
 2009 Toronto Argonauts Season

Toronto Argonauts seasons
Toronto Argonauts Season, 2009